"Madame Butterfly" is a short story by American lawyer and writer John Luther Long. It is based on the recollections of Long's sister, Jennie Correll, who had been to Japan with her husband, a Methodist missionary, and was influenced by  Pierre Loti's 1887 novel Madame Chrysanthème. It was published in Century Magazine in 1898, together with some of Long's other short fiction.

Plot 
An American naval officer, Lieutenant Benjamin Franklin Pinkerton, arrives in Japan to take up his duties on a ship  docked in Nagasaki. On the suggestion of his friend Sayre, he takes a Japanese wife and house for the duration of his stay there. His young bride, Cho-Cho-San, is a geisha whose family was strongly in favour of the marriage until Pinkerton forbade them from visiting. When they learned that they would not be allowed to visit they disowned Cho-Cho-San. Pinkerton's ship eventually sets sail from Japan. In his absence and unbeknown to him, she gives birth to their child, a son whom she names Trouble. As time goes by, Cho-Cho-San is still convinced that Pinkerton will return to her some day, but her maid, Suzuki, becomes increasingly skeptical. Then Goro, a marriage broker, arrives and proposes that she divorce Pinkerton, telling her that even if he does come back, he will leave her and take the child with him. He proposes a Japanese husband to look after her—Yamadori, a prince who had lived a long time in America. Although she has no intention of going through with Goro's plan, she tells him to arrange a meeting with Yamadori.

At the meeting Yamadori tells Cho-Cho-San that Pinkerton only thought of the marriage as temporary and suggests that he would eventually divorce her and the baby could well end up in an orphanage. Instead, his marriage proposal offered her the possibility of reconciling with her family and keeping her baby. Angry and upset at what she hears, she has Suzuki turn Yamadori and the marriage broker out of the house. She then visits the American consul in Nagasaki, Mr. Sharpless, in an attempt to allay her fears and ask his help in getting Pinkerton to return. As her story unfolds, Sharpless feels increasing contempt for Pinkerton. She asks him to write to Pinkerton and tell him that she is marrying Yamadori and will take their son with her if he does not return. However, she says that she has no intention of really doing this and only wants to play a "little joke" on him. Sharpless gently tells her that he could not take part in such a deception. He encourages her to accept Yamadori's offer and reconcile with her family.

Weeks pass with Cho-Cho-San anxiously scanning the horizon for the arrival of Pinkerton's ship. Finally, she sees it coming into the harbour and is overcome with emotion. She and Suzuki prepare the house with flowers to welcome him. Cho-Cho-San dresses in her finest kimono. Then she, Suzuki and the baby hide behind a shoji screen intending to surprise him when he arrives. They wait all night, but Pinkerton never comes. A week later, they see a passenger steamer in the harbour. On the deck is Pinkerton with a young blonde woman. Again she and Suzuki wait all night for him in vain. The next morning his warship is gone from the harbour. Distraught, she visits Sharpless to ask if he had written Pinkerton and why he has left without seeing her. To spare her feelings, Sharpless tells her that he had indeed written to Pinkerton who was on his way to see her but had many duties to perform and then his ship was suddenly ordered to China. Cho-Cho-San is sad but relieved. Then the blonde woman from the steamship enters the office, identifies herself as Pinkerton's wife and asks the consul to send the following telegram to her husband:

"Just saw the baby and his nurse.  Can't we have him at once? He is lovely. Shall see the mother about it tomorrow. Was not at home when I was there today. Expect to join you Wednesday week per Kioto Maru. May I bring him along? Adelaide."

In despair Cho-Cho-San rushes home. She bids farewell to Suzuki and the baby and shuts herself in her room to commit suicide with her father's sword. After the first thrust of the sword, she hesitates. Although she is bleeding the wound is not fatal. As she raises the sword again, Suzuki silently enters the room with the baby and pinches him to make him cry. Cho-Cho-San lets the sword drop to the floor. As the baby crawls onto Cho-Cho-San's lap, Suzuki dresses her wound. The story ends with the words: "When Mrs. Pinkerton called next day at the little house on Higashi Hill it was quite empty."

Gallery

Historical basis 
According to a book by Jan van Rij, Long's story was loosely based on the birth-mother of Tomisaburo, the British-Japanese adopted son of Thomas Blake Glover and his Japanese wife Awajiya Tsuru (淡路屋 ツル).Tomisaburo's birth-mother was Maki Kaga, who worked in the pleasure district of Nagasaki (Glover was not his birth-father, however).  It was Long's sister Sara Jane Correll who first used the name "Cho-Cho-San" for Maki Kaga.  The story also bears many similarities to the semi-autobiographical novel by Pierre Loti, Madame Chrysanthème, which also was set in Nagasaki and adapted into an opera.

Style 
Long's use of the exotic and the classical in "Madame Butterfly" reflected the blending of Japanese and traditional styles in the Arts and Crafts movement around the turn of the 19th century and American fascination with Japan that began with the "opening of Japan" by Matthew C. Perry in 1854.

Adaptations

Play 
The story interested American playwright David Belasco who, collaborating with Long, adapted it to a one-act play, Madame Butterfly: A Tragedy of Japan. The play premiered in New York's Herald Square Theatre on March 5, 1900. Seven weeks later, Belasco took it to London's Duke of York's Theatre, where it played to full houses.

In 1988, David Henry Hwang wrote a play entitled M. Butterfly which is a commentary on the racist stereotypes in the Puccini opera. Despite the tragic tone of the play, Hwang satirizes Western ignorance about Asia and the fantasy of the passive Asian woman. David Cronenberg adapted the play into a film in 1993.

Opera 
The production of the play caught the attention of Giacomo Puccini, who would compose the Orientalist opera Madama Butterfly to a libretto based on Belasco's play and Long's short story. The original version of the opera, in two acts, had its premiere February 17, 1904 at La Scala in Milan.

Film 
The story has been adapted for film several times:
Madame Butterfly (1915 film), an American silent film directed by Sidney Olcott
Madame Butterfly, an alternative name for Harakiri (1919 film), a German silent film directed by Fritz Lang
Madame Butterfly (1932 film), an American film directed by Marion Gering
Madame Butterfly (1954 film), a joint Italian-Japanese film directed by Carmine Gallone  
Madame Butterfly (1995 film), a European production directed by Frédéric Mitterrand

References

Sources
Clapp, John Bouvé and Edgett, Edwin Francis (1902). Plays of the Present. Dunlap Society, pp. 165–167
van Rij, Jan (2001). Madame Butterfly: Japonisme, Puccini, & the Search for the Real Cho-Cho-San. Stone Bridge Press. 
 Wisenthal, Jonathan ed. (2006). A Vision of the Orient: Texts, intertexts, and contexts of Madame Butterfly. University of Toronto Press.

External links

 Madame Butterfly 1903 Grosset and Dunlap "Japanese Edition" with photogravure illustrations by C. Yarnall Abbott (1870–1938)
 

American short stories
1898 short stories
Japan in fiction
Japan in non-Japanese culture
Short stories adapted into films
Short stories adapted into plays